Ray E. Kidder was an American physicist and nuclear weapons designer. He is best known for his outspoken views on nuclear weapons policy issues, including nuclear testing, stockpile management, and arms control.

Kidder was a weapons physicist at Lawrence Livermore National Laboratory for 35 years, and retired in 1990. He had arrived at the laboratory in 1956. During his tenure, as well as after his retirement, he became involved in a number of controversial policy issues.

In 1960, Kidder worked with John Nuckolls and Stirling Colgate at Livermore to develop computer simulations for producing nuclear fusion in laser-compressed deuterium-tritium capsules. The results of this work led to Livermore's laser fusion program in 1962, which Kidder was appointed the head of. This program used weapons-derived calculations in an attempt to make usable nuclear fusion sources.

In 1979, Kidder was a witness for the defense in the United States v. The Progressive case, in which the U.S. Department of Energy sought to suppress the publication of a magazine article alleged to reveal the "secret of the hydrogen bomb". Kidder favored uncensored publication of the material, which had been compiled from unclassified sources, and claimed that Nobel Prize-winning physicist Hans Bethe had been misinformed when Bethe swore an affidavit in favor of censorship. Bethe and Kidder then engaged in a classified correspondence debating the issue. The correspondence was declassified in 2001.

In 1997, Kidder argued against the Department of Energy's Stockpile Stewardship and Management Program, calling it "misguided in a number of ways", including introducing unnecessary changes in warhead materials, the cost of large-scale computational and experimental resources, and its effects on arms control efforts. He also criticized the building of the National Ignition Facility, saying it was not essential for stockpile stewardship.

In 1999, Kidder co-authored an op-ed article in The Washington Post, favoring the Comprehensive Test Ban Treaty then pending before the United States Senate.

In 2000, Kidder wrote to the Justice Ministry of Israel regarding the Mordechai Vanunu case, saying that he did not believe that Vanunu possessed any technical nuclear information that had not already been made public. (The Israeli government opposed Vanunu's release from prison in 1998, claiming he still possessed secret information.)

Kidder resided in Pleasanton, California.

Selected bibliography

Notes

External links 
 Stockpile Stewardship and Free Speech at the Labs
 Reports by Ray Kidder at fas.org

2019 deaths
21st-century American physicists
American nuclear physicists
Lawrence Livermore National Laboratory staff
Nuclear secrecy
Arms control people
Nuclear weapons policy
1923 births
Loomis Chaffee School alumni